NGC 5886 is an +14 magnitude elliptical galaxy in the constellation Boötes. It was originally discovered by John Herschel in 1828 with an 18.7 inch reflector.

References

External links
 

Boötes
Elliptical galaxies
5886